is an underground metro station located in Naka-ku, Nagoya, Aichi Prefecture, Japan operated by the Nagoya Municipal Subway. It is an interchange station between the Sakura-dōri Line and the Meijō Line and is located 3.3 rail kilometers from the terminus of the Sakura-dōri Line at Taiko-dori Station and 3.4 rail kilometers from the terminus of the Meijō Line at Kanayama Station. 
This station is located in part of the upper class district of Nagoya.

History
Yagoto Station was opened on 9 October 1989 for both the Sakura-dōri Line and the Meijō Line. Platform screen doors were installed on the Sakura-dōri Line platforms from March 2011.

Lines
Nagoya Municipal Subway
Meijō Line (Station number: M06)
Sakura-dōri Line (Station number: S05)

Layout
Yagoto Station has one underground island platform for use by the Sakura-dōri Line and two underground opposed side platforms for use by the Meijō Line.

Platforms

References

External links

 Yagoto Station official web site 
 Hisaya-ōdōri Station (Transportation Bureau City of Nagoya)

Railway stations in Japan opened in 1989
Railway stations in Aichi Prefecture
Sakae, Nagoya